The Missouri State Highway Patrol (MSHP) is the highway patrol agency for Missouri and has jurisdiction all across the state. It is a division of the Missouri Department of Public Safety. Colonel Eric T. Olson has been serving as the 24th superintendent since March 15, 2019.

In 1992, MSHP became the 10th state law enforcement agency to receive accreditation from the Commission on Accreditation for Law Enforcement Agencies (CALEA).

Purpose

State laws pertaining to the Highway Patrol including its creation, powers, structure, mission and duties are specified in Chapter 43 of Missouri Revised Statutes (RSMo). According to Chapter 43.025 RSMo:  "The primary purpose of the highway patrol is to enforce the traffic laws and promote safety upon the highways. In addition the Missouri State Highway Patrol has responsibility in criminal interdiction which involves the suppression of marijuana, cocaine, and narcotics on the state's roads and highways including the Missouri Interstate System. As near as practicable all personnel of the patrol shall be used for carrying out these purposes." The MSHP has a criminal investigation division that investigates crimes statewide such as murder, robbery, burglary, rape and financial crimes.

Organization & Troops

General Headquarters (GHQ) and the Law Enforcement Academy are located in Jefferson City, Missouri, the state capital.

The state is divided into nine Troops, with Troop headquarters and communications centers located in the following cities:

 Troop A: Lee's Summit (Kansas City) 
 Troop B: Macon 
 Troop C: Weldon Spring (St. Louis) 
 Troop D: Springfield 
 Troop E: Poplar Bluff 
 Troop F: Jefferson City 
 Troop G: Willow Springs 
 Troop H: St. Joseph 
 Troop I: Rolla

In addition, three of the Troops maintain service centers:
 Troop C: Park Hills
 Troop D: Carthage
 Troop E: Sikeston
 Recruiting & Community Outreach Division is housed in the MSHP General Headquarters in Jefferson City, Missouri.

Badge and rank structure

The Missouri State Highway Patrol is one of only five State Patrol forces that do not wear a badge on their uniform shirts. The Missouri State Highway Patrol uses a paramilitary rank structure and has the following ranks:

State Trooper (Recruit) is the initial rank of oncoming Missouri State Highway Patrol, held while undergoing training at the Missouri State Highway Patrol Law Enforcement Academy.

Vehicles

The MSHP utilizes a variety of vehicles, including but not limited to, the Dodge Charger, Ford Police Interceptor Utility (Explorer), Ford F-150 and 250 series, Chevrolet Tahoe PPV, and the Chevrolet Silverado 1500 and 2500 series. Both fully marked and semi-marked vehicles are used frequently. Colors include but not limited to: white, tan, blue, silver, black, gray, and maroon.

Weapons

Lethal Options:
 Glock 17 GEN 5 9mm (As of late 2018)
 Glock 22 .40 S&W (phased out as of late 2018)
 Colt AR-15A1 (M16A1) 5.56x45mm
 Remington Model 870 12 Gauge

Less Lethal Options:
 Pepper Spray (OC Spray)
 ASP Baton
 Taser

Fallen Officers
31 Troopers have been killed while on duty since 1931 with one Highway Patrol member dying in World War II.

The members are as follows:

Superintendents
The Missouri State Highway Patrol is headed by the Superintendent of the Highway Patrol, who is nominated by the Governor of Missouri and confirmed by the Missouri State Senate. The Superintendent of the Highway Patrol commands more than 1,356 troopers and 1,87 civilian support staff who help provide a full range of policing and public safety services to Missourian on behalf of the Missouri State Highway Patrol.

See also
 List of law enforcement agencies in Missouri
 State police
 State patrol
 Highway patrol

References

External links
 Missouri State Highway Patrol web site
 Missouri State Highway Patrol History
 Missouri Department Of Public Safety
Publications by or about the Missouri State Highway Patrol at Internet Archive.

State law enforcement agencies of Missouri
Government agencies established in 1931
Law enforcement in Missouri
1931 establishments in Missouri
Downtown St. Louis